Sir Richard Williams ( – 20 October 1544), also known as Sir Richard Cromwell, was a Welsh soldier and courtier in the reign of Henry VIII who knighted him on 2 May 1540. He was a maternal nephew of Thomas Cromwell, profiting from the Dissolution of the Monasteries in which he took an active part. He was the patrilineal great-grandfather of Oliver Cromwell.

Early life
Richard Williams was born about 1510 in the parish of Llanishen, Glamorganshire. He was eldest son and heir to Morgan (ap William) Williams, an aspiring Welsh lawyer (and a paternal descendant of Cadwgan ap Bleddyn, prince of Powys) who moved from Glamorgan to Putney where he initially pursued his business of innkeeper and brewer. Morgan Williams' good fortune was to marry Katherine, the sister of Thomas Cromwell, long before the commencement of the latter's illustrious career as Henry VIII's great minister. In later life, Williams and his son would benefit financially from this relationship, receiving substantial landholdings confiscated from the church.

Protégé of Thomas Cromwell
Richard was brought into the court of King Henry VIII by an alliance with Thomas Cromwell, the great favourite of Henry, whom that monarch raised from a humble situation to be Earl of Essex, Vicar-General, and Knight of the Garter. When Thomas Cromwell made his will in July 1529 his nephew, whose parents were now dead, was then in the service of the Marquess of Dorset (father of Henry Grey, and grandfather of Lady Jane Grey). By the autumn of 1529, he had adopted the name Cromwell, and following Dorset's death in 1530, he was employed by Stephen Gardiner until early 1533 when he joined his uncle's household at Austin Friars and while in his service was introduced at court. For the next ten years, as Richard Cromwell alias Williams, he acted as a trusted agent for the minister, often joining with him in offices and grants. Introduced to Henry VIII, by so powerful an interest as Cromwell, and possessing many qualifications, he soon benefitted from the royal bounty which Henry lavished on his favourites. He was entrusted with considerable appointments early in the administration of his relation; and it appears that he was active in suppressing the Pilgrimage of Grace insurrection.

Dissolution of the Monasteries

During the Dissolution of the Monasteries, Sir Richard was appointed one of the Visitors of the religious houses; his zeal in the cause of both the king and Thomas Cromwell met with an ample reward; perhaps the latter was happy to raise up one of his family to assist and support him.

It is certain that on 8 March 1537/8, he had the grant of the nunnery of Hinchingbrooke, in Huntingdonshire. The value of it, as stated in the deed was £19. 9s. 2d.; but we must suppose this monastery to have been very much under-rated: for the grant states the lands and premises given to Sir Richard as lying in the several parishes and hamlets of Hinchinbrooke, Huntingdon, Stewkley-Magna, Stewkley-Parva, Turkington, Houghton, Esington, Alconbury, Paxton-Magna, Paxton-Parva, Hail Weston, Waresley and Bawynhoo, all in the county of Huntingdon; Eltisley, Bottisham and Boxworth in Cambridgeshire; Staplewe, and Bewlow, in Bedfordshire; Hamildon-Parva, in Rutland; and Stoke Doyle and Oakley, in Northamptonshire. The same year he had also a royal grant of the monastery of Sawtry-Judith, in the county of Huntingdon, valued £199 11s. 1d. 9 April 1539, he received for the trifling sum of £1 0s. 5d. a grant of certain premises, lying in Eynesbury, Eton, and Little Paxton in Huntingdonshire, belonging to the late dissolved chantry of Swavesey, in the county of Cambridge. These were very considerable places; but in the same year he had a grant from the crown of the Abbey of the Grey-Friars, in Great Yarmouth, in Norfolk; and 4 March 1540, also the site of the rich Abbey of Ramsey in Huntingdonshire, with the several meres or lakes belonging to it, in the same parish; it is expressed in the grant, that it passed in consideration of his good service, and the payment of £4,963 4s. 2d. to be held in capite by knights service. Considerable as this sum then was, it was trifling in comparison of the prodigious value of that abbey and the annual revenue amounted to £1,987. 15s. 3d. The other grants, though many of them were not wholly free, were probably upon easy conditions. It is very certain that the dissolved religious houses were disposed of, for almost nothing; and this knight, we may presume, from his alliance with the vicar-general (who, in fact, had the disposal of them) had great favour shown him; especially, as he was beloved by the sovereign, and was a Visitor; all these grants passed to him by the names of Rich. Williams, otherwise Cromwell.

Member of Parliament and High Sheriff
By 1539 he was a gentleman of the privy chamber, and in the same year was elected MP for the seat of Huntingdonshire. In 1539, or early 1540, at the age of thirty, he may have been the subject of a portrait by Hans Holbein the Younger.

He was knighted 2 May 1540 during a tournament at Westminster where he distinguished himself by his military skill and gallantry:

Sir Richard and the five other challengers, had each of them, as a reward for their valour, 100 marks annually, with a house to live in, to them and their heirs for ever, granted out of the monastery of the Friary of St Francis, in Stamford, which was dissolved, 8 October 1538, which the king was better able to do, as Sir William Weston, the last prior, who had an annuity out of the monastery, died two days after the jousts.

We may form an idea of the esteem that the king had for him on account of his gallantry from the following anecdote; when Henry saw Sir Richard's prowess he exclaimed, "Formerly thou wast my Dick, but hereafter thou shalt be my diamond"; and dropped a diamond ring from his finger, which Sir Richard taking up, he presented it to him, bidding him afterwards bear such a one in the fore gamb of the demy lion in his crest.

The fall and execution of Sir Richard's uncle Thomas Cromwell, 1st Earl of Essex, in July 1540, did not (as might have been supposed) adversely affect his social standing, or private fortune. He was appointed High Sheriff of Cambridgeshire and Huntingdonshire in 1541, and was again returned as member of parliament for Huntingdonshire, in the parliament which began 16 January 1542. In this year Henry VIII gave him a grant of the monastery of St Mary's, in the town of Huntingdon, and St Neots Priory, whose yearly values were £232 7s. and £256 1s. 3d.

Besides the grants already mentioned, Sir Richard had given to him the office of steward of the lordship of Archenfield, with the constableship of Goodrich Castle in the Welsh Marches, and the power of appointing the master serjeant and porter belonging to those offices, during the nonage of the earl of Shrewsbury. He had also grants of the priory of St Helen Bishopsgate in London; the castles, lordships, and manors of Manorbier and Penally, both in the county of Pembroke, of the value of £100 to him and his heirs-male by knights' service; and also by exchange for other lands, Neath Abbey in Glamorgan; which last he probably procured, because it lay near his paternal seat and the place of his birth; the times of the pasting these grants are unknown.

War in France
When war broke out with France in 1542, he was sent over to that kingdom, as general of the infantry: all the officers for this expedition were selected, they being "all right hardie and valiant knights, esquires, and gentlemen". This force, which amounted to 6,000 men, having crossed the sea, marched out of Calais, to join the Emperor Charles V on 22 July in an attempt to retake Landrecies, which had lately been wrested from that monarch by the French. King Francis I of France, anxious to save the place, appeared before it; and the allies, with the Emperor at their head, as boldly opposed them; but, when both parties thought a battle inevitable, and the allies had drawn out their army, the French King took that opportunity to relieve the garrison and having resupplied the place with men, ammunition, and provisions; and marched away. The allies, to revenge themselves, attacked the Dauphin who was left with the rearguard; but, being too eager, they fell into an ambuscade, and many of the English were taken prisoners: amongst them were Sir George Carew, Sir Thomas Palmer, and Sir Edward Bellingham. However, the English amply retorted upon the French, killing and taking great numbers prisoner. Mark Noble was of the opinion, that the English forces behaved themselves with great gallantry during their short stay in France; which was only until November in the same year. In the account of this expedition history does not record the particular achievements of individuals that composed the army but Noble speculates that Sir Richard behaved with his usual good conduct; especially as, in the following year 1544, Henry appointed him constable of Berkeley Castle.

Marriage and issue

By 8 March 1534 Richard had married Frances (–), daughter to Thomas Murfyn (d.1523), an alderman and a former Lord Mayor of London, and his second wife, Elizabeth Donne, daughter to Sir Angel Donne and Anne Hawardine. Frances's stepfather, Sir Thomas Denys, whom her mother married in 1524, was a "great man of Devon" and friend of Thomas Cromwell. The couple had two sons:

Henry Williams, alias Cromwell (1537–1604), Richard's eldest son and heir, grandfather of Oliver Cromwell.
Francis Williams, alias Cromwell (–1598), was one of the Knights of the Shire for the county of Huntingdon in 1572, and later Sheriff of Cambridgeshire and Huntingdonshire; according to Fuller, he resided at Hinchingbrooke; but his usual place of residence was at Hinchinford, in Huntingdonshire. He married Marg. the daughter of Henry Mannock, of that place, and died 4 August 1598: by the inquisitio post mortem taken at St Ives, 16 November following, it appears that he left a son, Henry Williams, alias Cromwell, then 23 years of age, his heir, possessed of the site of St Neots Priory, called the Fermerne; manor of St Neots, valued at £14. per ann. with 80 acres of pasture, called Little and Great-Dirty Wintringham; the manor of Grafham, valued at £9. per annum and the manor of Hardwick, valued at £14. per annum held of the king by knights' service.

Death
His wife was still living in June 1542, but had died before her husband made his will, which was dated 20 June 1544. He died on 20 October 1544. In his will he styles himself Sir Richard Williams, otherwise called Sir Richard Cromwell, knt. and of his majesty's privy chamber; he directed that his body should be buried in the place where he should die; and devises his estates in the counties of Cambridge, Huntingdon, Lincoln, and Bedford, to his eldest son Henry, with the sum of £500 to purchase him necessary furniture, when he should come of age: his estates in Glamorganshire he devises to his son Francis and bequeathed £300 to each of his nieces, Joan, and Ann, daughters of his brother, Walter Cromwell; and directed that if Thomas Wingfield, then Sir Richard's ward, should choose to marry either of them, he should have his wardship remitted to him, otherwise the same should be sold. He also left three of his best great horses to the king, and one other great horse to his cousin, Gregory Cromwell, after the king had chosen: legacies were also left to his kinsmen, Sir John Williams, and Sir Edward North, chancellor of the court of augmentation; and to several other persons, who seem to have been servants. Gabriel Donne, Andrew Judde, William Coke, Philip Lentall, and Richard Servington, were appointed executors. His will was proved on 24 November 1546.

Noble observes that Sir Richard must have left a prodigious fortune to his family, by what he possessed by descent, grants and purchases of church-lands, and from the sums he must have acquired by filling very lucrative employments, with the liberal donations of Henry VIII. This is evident from his possessions in Huntingdonshire, the annual amount of which, at an easy rent, were worth at least £3,000 per annum. These estates only, in Fuller's time were, he says, valued by some at £20,000 and by others as £30,000 annually, and upwards; and from what these estates now let for, in and near Ramsey and Huntingdon (which are only a part of them) Noble presumes that Sir Richard's estates, in that county only, would in 1787 bring in as large a revenue as any peer at that time enjoyed; and yet it is evident that Sir Richard had considerable property in several other counties as well.

Notes

Citations

Attribution

References

Further reading

External links

 Cromwell, alias Williams, Richard (by 1512-44), of London; Stepney, Mdx. and Hinchingbroke, Hunts. in The History of Parliament: the House of Commons 1509–1558, ed. S.T. Bindoff, 1982.
 Teri Fitzgerald, Sir Richard Cromwell: A King’s Diamond
 The Cromwell Museum, Huntingdon
 Pedigree of Oliver Cromwell

People associated with the Dissolution of the Monasteries
1544 deaths
16th-century Welsh military personnel
English MPs 1539–1540
English MPs 1542–1544
High Sheriffs of Cambridgeshire and Huntingdonshire
Gentlemen of the Privy Chamber
Knights Bachelor
Richard
Welsh army officers
Year of birth uncertain
Military personnel from Cardiff
Llanishen, Cardiff
1510 births
16th-century Welsh politicians